Mammoth Mammoth (often stylized as MAMMOTH MAMMOTH) are an Australian hard rock/stoner rock band that formed in 2007 in Melbourne. The band independently released their self-titled debut EP in June 2008 through their label, Golden Triangle, and followed this with a full-length album titled "Volume II: Mammoth" in August 2009.

In November 2012, their third album Volume III: Hell’s Likely was released, and after good sales and recognition in Europe They signed with Austrian/German label Napalm Records. Mammoth Mammoth's sound has been likened to "Motorhead doing mushrooms with Black Sabbath backstage at a Butt Hole Surfers concert".

The band are known for their raucous, live shows; Heavy Magazine Australia said, "their live reputation precedes them ... Mikey Tucker knows no boundaries and goes in hard every time; throwing himself off the stage and throughout the crowd." Mammoth Mammoth have been banned from performing at two music venues in Melbourne. According to an interview in the blog Riff media, Tucker fell through a glass window at The Tote Hotel after head-butting it to get the attention of concert attendees smoking outside. He then continued the show covered in blood.

The band describes their sound as "patented, good-time murder-fuzz" and "more awesome than God’s tits". They describe the effect of their music as "capable of killing unicorns". Mammoth Mammoth describe their songwriting style as "four guys in a boxing ring with no referee".

Career

Background and name

Mammoth Mammoth were formed by Ben 'Cuz' Couzens and Gareth 'Gash' Sweet as a result of their growing boredom with the Melbourne rock scene, which they saw as being full of "shoe-gazing indie-rock bands doing very little to entertain or commit". They describe themselves as "a heavy rock band from Melbourne Australia that smash the shit out of their stoner, glam, doom, punk and psychedelic rock influences". The band name is derived from the name of the woolly mammoth, stemming from their desire to have a band with the "biggest" name they could think of. Couzens and Trobbiani were previously co members of Melbourne rock band Furious Dragon Love; at that same time Couzens was working on a side project with friend and bassist Gareth "Gash" Sweet. Tucker was invited to join on vocals when his band Black Fang broke up and former band mate Trobbiani was recruited to play drums, all combining to form the original Mammoth Mammoth line up in October 2007.

2008: Volume I: Mammoth Mammoth EP

In 2008, the band recorded their debut EP before having played a live show. At their earliest most intense live shows the audience and the press were unsure whether the band's performance was taking the piss or for real. In interviews, the band comments on their hands-on approach when creating their videos, concert posters, and album artwork. The song Weapon of Mass Self-Destruction from their EP Volume I features a video that was banned from YouTube because of its explicit images of vintage 1970s vintage pornography. In response, they posted it on pornography site tube8, where it received millions of views in its first few days.

2009 – 2011: Volume II: Mammoth and line-up changes
In 2009 the band made their first appearance at the CherryRock Festival held in Melbourne's iconic laneway AC/DC Lane. In 2010, following the release of Volume II: Mammoth, their second self-titled album, the band toured Australia with fellow Melbourne hard rock band Airbourne and again played CherryRock Festival. Shortly after, Sweet left the band and was temporarily replaced by Simon Jaunay (Spiff) before they chose Pete Bell as the band's permanent bass player.

2012 – 2013: Volume III: Hell’s Likely

Mammoth Mammoth created the basic outline for their album Volume III: Hell’s Likely over a continuous, three-day jamming session.  They later recorded the album in two weeks at Toyland and Goatsounds Studios in Melbourne. They employed Jason Fuller, producer and bassist for Australian metal band Blood Duster, to work with them on the album. Guitarist Ben Couzens said working on material for the album meant the band "just played around with a bunch of jams."

In 2012, after the Australian release of Volume III: Hell’s Likely, Mammoth Mammoth were approached by Napalm Records and subsequently signed an international recording contract. The album was re-released internationally to positive reviews and the band supported it with their 2013 European tour. Metal Hammer magazine's German, French and UK editions voted Hell’s Likely number two for "album of the month" in December 2012. Mammoth Mammoth returned to Australia to play Melbourne's CherryRock Festival in AC/DC Lane, sharing the bill with fellow Australian hard rockers, Rose Tattoo.

2014 – 2016: Volume IV: Hammered Again

In 2014, the band wrote and recorded their fourth studio album, Volume IV: Hammered Again. The first video release for the track Looking Down the Barrel is a tribute to Penelope Spheeris's The Decline Of Western Civilization Part 2: The Metal Years, in which W.A.S.P. guitarist Chris Holmes sums up the era as he is being interviewed while drinking vodka and floating in a pool while his mother watches.

The video's recurring theme is nihilism, which run through a number of the album's songs. On completion of the album, the band toured throughout Europe and alongside former Kyuss vocalist John Garcia and followed up with supports of U.S. doom legends Sleep. In 2016, the band made a record fourth appearance on the main stage of CherryRock, sharing the bill with Kadavar, Supersuckers and Richie Ramone.

2016 – 2017: Mammoth Bloody Mammoth

In 2016, the band returned briefly to the studio to write and record an EP, Mammoth Bloody Mammoth. The album featured a cover of the MC5's Kick Out The Jams. The EP was supported with a European tour with label mates Green Leaf and My Sleeping Karma and shows in Australia supporting Hellyeah and Black Label Society.

2017-2020: Volume V: Mount The Mountain and Kreuzung

The band's fifth full length album, Volume V: Mount The Mountain was released through Napalm Records in April 2017. The Mount The Mountain European Tour took place through April and May of the same year before tensions in the band saw Tucker and Trobbiani carry on without Couzens and Bell with stand-in musicians, Marco Gennaro and Kris Sinister to complete shows that year.

In 2018 Gennaro and Sinister became key song writers on MAMMOTH MAMMOTH's sixth album, 'Kreuzung'. The album was written over summer of 2018 in Berlin and recorded later that year.  

In August 2020, a statement was posted on MAMMOTH MAMMOTH's social media accounts, "F@#k you Corona virus! While the world is afraid of blood, sweat and beers, MAMMOTH MAMMOTH simply cannot exist. We’re outta here!" It was unclear of the official status of the band.

2021 - Present: Reunion and Live Album

Exactly one year later, the band announced that they have reunited its classic line-up of Mikey Tucker, Frank 'Bones' Trobbiani, Ben 'Cuz' Couzens and Pete Bell for the first time in 4 years. The band also announced they had signed a record deal with Golden Robot Records with plans for an album in 2021. Due to on-going Covid related issues, the release of the bands live album was delayed. On Dec 2 2022 the first singles from the forthcoming live album were released (Sittin' Pretty/Love Gun) to coincide with their first Australian show in six years with Nashville Pussy (USA).

Band members
Ben 'Cuz' Couzens (guitars)
Pete Bell (bass)
Frank 'Bones' Trobbiani (drums)
Mikey Tucker (vocals)

Discography

Albums

Extended Plays

Awards and nominations

Music Victoria Awards
The Music Victoria Awards are an annual awards night celebrating Victorian music. They commenced in 2006.

! 
|-
| 2017
| Mount the Mountain
| Best Heavy Album
| 
| 
|-

References

Musical groups established in 2007
Australian hard rock musical groups
Musical groups from Melbourne